is a Japanese animation studio founded in June 2006. The studio is based in Nerima, Tokyo and is a subsidiary of Studio Hibari.

Works

Television series

Original net animation

Footnotes

References

External links

 

 
Japanese companies established in 2006
Animation studios in Tokyo
Japanese animation studios
Mass media companies established in 2006